Malgassesia ankaratralis is a moth of the family Sesiidae. It is known from Madagascar.

References

Sesiidae
Moths of Madagascar
Moths of Africa
Moths described in 1957